Lélia Abramo (February 8, 1911 – April 9, 2004) was an Italian-Brazilian actress and political activist.

Biography
Daughter of Italian immigrants, Abramo was born and died in São Paulo, but lived in Italy from 1938 to 1950, suffering through the privations of World War II. Along with her brothers Cláudio Abramo and plastic artist Lívio Abramo she is part of one of the most prominent families in Brazilian history in both politics and the arts.

Along with Mario Pedrosa, she has always been considered a sympathizer of trotskysm. Lélia Abramo was also a militant and was one of the founder of the Partido dos Trabalhadores (Worker's Party) along with Mario Pedrosa, Manuel da Conceição, Sérgio Buarque de Holanda, Moacir Gadotti and Apolônio de Carvalho. She was personally active in many different movements in Brazilian politics like Diretas Já.

Awards
1958 Saci - character Romana - Black-tie
1958 Associação Paulista de Críticos de Arte (APCA) - character Romana - Black-tie
1958 Governador do Estado - character Romana - Black-tie
1958 Círculo Independente de Críticos Teatrais do Rio de Janeiro - character Romana - Black-tie
1958 Associação Brasileira de Críticos Teatrais - character Romana - Black-tie
1964 Roquete Pinto - SP. All her work in the theater
1975 Associação Paulista de Críticos de Arte (APCA). All her work in the Brazilian theater
1976 Governador do Estado - Best Actor - character Pozzo in Waiting for Godot

Filmography and television work
1990 - A história de Ana Raio e Zé Trovão .... Lúcia
1986 - Mania de querer .... Margô
1985 - O tempo e o vento .... Bibiana (idosa)
1983 - Pão pão, beijo beijo .... Mama Vitória
1982 - Avenida Paulista .... Bebel
1979 - Pai Herói .... Januária Brandão
1976 - O julgamento .... Felícia
1975 - Um dia, o amor .... Lucinha
1973 - Os ossos do barão - Bianca Ghirotto
1972 - Uma Rosa com Amor - Amália
1972 - Na idade do lobo
1971 - Nossa filha Gabriela .... Donana
1970 - O meu pé de laranja lima .... Estefânia
1970 - As bruxas .... Chiquinha
1969 - Dez vidas
1968 - O terceiro pecado
1967 - Paixão proibida
1966 - Redenção .... Carmela
1966 - Calúnia .... Sarah
1965 - Um rosto perdido .... irmã Rosa
1965 - Os quatro filhos
1964 - Prisioneiro de um sonho
1964 - João Pão
1961 - A Muralha

Theater
1958 - Teatro de Arena - SP  -  Romana in Eles Não Usam Black-Tie de Gianfrancesco Guarnieri
1959 - São Paulo SP  -  Gente como a Gente
1960 - São Paulo SP  -  Mother Courage de Brecht
1961 - São Paulo SP  -  Raízes
1961 - São Paulo SP  -  Pintado de Alegre
1961 - São Paulo SP  -  Oscar
1961 - São Paulo SP  -  Os Rinocerontes
1962 - São Paulo SP  -  Yerma
1962 - São Paulo SP  -  As Visões de Simone Machard
1963 - São Paulo SP  -  Os Ossos do Barão
1964 - São Paulo SP  -  Vereda da Salvação
1965 - São Paulo SP  -  Os Espectros
1968 - São Paulo SP  -  Lisístrata
1968 - São Paulo SP  -  Agamêmnon
1969 - São Paulo SP  -  Romeu e Julieta
1975 - São Paulo SP  -  Ricardo III
1977 - São Paulo SP  -  Pozzo em Esperando Godot de Samuel Beckett. Direção Antunes Filho
1985 - Rio de Janeiro RJ  -  Mother -  Brecht

Series

Drama at TV

Cinema
1994 - Mil e Uma
1992 - Manôushe
1983 - Janete
1981 - Eles não usam black-tie
1979 - Maldita Coincidência
1975 - Joanna Francesa
1974 - O Comprador de Fazendas
1970 - Beto Rochfeller
1970 - Cleo e Daniel
1968 - O Quarto
1967 - O Caso dos Irmãos Neves
1967 - O Anjo Assassino
1964 - Vereda de Salvação
1960 - Cidade Ameaçada

References
 Vida e Arte - Memórias de Lélia Abramo. São Paulo:Fundação Perseu Abramo, 1997.
 Participação na Frente Única Anti-Facista (1934), artigo de Augusto C. Buonicore 27 October 2007
 Eduardo Maffei. A Batalha da Praça da Sé. RJ: Editora Philobiblion, 1984.
 ABRAMO, Fúlvio. "Frente Única Antifascista, 1934-1984". SP: Cadernos do Centro de Documentação Mário Pedrosa, 1984. Ano I, número um.
 ABRAMO, Fúlvio. Entrevista. Revista Teoria e Debate. Ano I, número 1.
 ABRAMO, Lélia. Entrevista. Revista Teoria e Debate. Ano II, número 5.

External links
Filmography
 Interview with Revista Isto É
 Enciclopédia Itaú Cultural

Brazilian telenovela actresses
Brazilian film actresses
Brazilian people of Italian descent
1911 births
2004 deaths
Actresses from São Paulo